The Ax:son Johnson family is a prominent Swedish business family, controlling the Axel Johnson Group and Nordstjernan.

History 
In 1873, Axel Johnson founded the trading company A. Johnson & Co., the predecessor of today's Axel Johnson AB.

In 1890, Axel Johnson formed the Nordstjernan shipping company, which expanded rapidly. He managed to break the international coffee monopoly, known as the "coffee conference", a strictly controlled pricing cartel for the transportation of coffee to Europe. Axel Johnson built under favorable external conditions the company that was to form the basis of the Axel Johnson Group, and which was later developed by his son, Axel Ax:son Johnson (1876–1958) and following generations.

Notable family members 
Axel Johnson (1844–1910), son of the Carl Johan Johnson, businessman and industrialist, Founder of the Axel Johnson Group and Nordstjernan.
Axel Ax:son Johnson (1876–1958), son of Axel Johnson, businessman, industrialist and consul general.
Helge Ax:son Johnson (1878–1941), son of Axel Johnson, industrialist and art patron, owner of   Berga Castle
Harry Ax:son Johnson (1881–1939), son of Axel Johnson, diplomat.
Axel Ax:son Johnson (junior) (1910–1988), son of Axel Ax:son Johnson, businessman, industrialist and mining engineer.
Bo Ax:son Johnson (1917–1997), son of Axel Ax:son Johnson, businessman and industrialist.
Antonia Ax:son Johnson (born 1943), daughter of Axel Ax:son Johnson (junior), businesswoman.
Viveca Ax:son Johnson (born 1963), daughter of Bo Ax:son Johnson, businesswoman.

References 

Business families of Sweden
Swedish businesspeople
Business families